Tylototriton yangi is a species of salamander in the family Salamandridae endemic to southern Yunnan, China. It is found throughout Honghe and Wenshan Prefectures.

References

Hou M, Li P, Lu S 2012 Morphological research development of genus Tylototriton and primary confirmation of the status of four cryptic species (in Chinese). J Huangshan Univ 14:61-65. (authors of name: Hou, Zhang, Zhou, Li and Lu).

Tylototriton